Largo High School is a public High School in Largo census-designated place, Prince George's County, Maryland, United States. Operated by Prince George's County Public Schools, it serves students of grades 9 to 12.

The school is operated by the Prince George's County Public Schools system.  The school's athletic teams are known as the Lions. The school serves about 870 students in grades 9 through 12.  The principal is Albert T. Lewis.  The school's name originates from the Largo unincorporated community, which is served by the school. Other places served include sections of the CDPs of Kettering, Brock Hall, Forestville, and Westphalia. It serves sections of the former Greater Upper Marlboro CDP.

Largo High School is located next to Prince George's Community College.

History
In August 2014, former English teacher Jon Everhart won a $350,000 jury award after accusing the school system of discriminating against him because he is Caucasian.  It was alleged in his lawsuit against the school board that former principal Angelique Simpson-Marcus forced him out of his job because of his race and faced years of racial harassment from her.  Everhart sued in 2010 after he was fired and was one of several employees who made allegations of harassment.

Athletics
Swimming
Football
Soccer (boys and girls)
Lacrosse
Baseball
Softball
Volleyball
Track & Field
Cross Country
Basketball
Cheerleading
Tennis
BAND

Notable people
Aisha Braveboy – Prince George's County States Attorney and former Maryland State Delegate
Steve Byrnes – former NASCAR TV analyst
Kevin Glover – NFL player for the Detroit Lions and Seattle Seahawks (1985–1999)
Usama Young – NFL player for the Cleveland Browns and Oakland Raiders
Javicia Leslie - actress

References

External links
 

Public high schools in Maryland
Magnet schools in Maryland
Schools in Prince George's County, Maryland